The World Affairs Council of the Desert, a non-partisan and non-profit organization, located in the Coachella Valley, California. The Council provides an opportunity for the discussion of current national and international topics.

Founded in the early seventies as the “Desert Forum”, it served initially as a branch of the Los Angeles Council. By 1975, the organization had changed its name to The World Affairs Council of the Desert and is currently located in Pam Desert, CA. Over the years the Council has increased its membership, program series and established itself as a separate non-profit corporation.

Mission statement
It states that its mission is "to provide education on vital issues of global importance to diverse audiences in the Coachella Valley".

Programs and events
The World Affairs Council organizes a number of events in the Coachella Valley geared toward providing educational opportunities focused on international affairs. These events include public programs featuring journalists, public officials, and foreign policy experts, seminars for educators, and outreach programs for students.

Speaker Program
The Speaker Program is a series of dinner lectures open to the public featuring speakers that are experts in their fields of endeavor such as ambassadors, foreign dignitaries, corporate leaders and higher education professors. Presentations by the speakers cover current national and international issues.

Distinguished Speakers Series
The Distinguished Speaker series allows council members and guests to attend talks with leading, environmental figures in the international community.

Youth programs
The World Affairs Council of the Desert, invites high school and college students to its dinner events and conducts the annual Academic Worldquest in the Coachella Valley. Worldquest is an academic competition with programs geared toward high school students in which teams answer questions pertaining to foreign affairs, geography, foreign culture, international organizations, and recent history. The winning team, with four members, goes on to a national competition arranged by the World Affairs Councils of America in Washington, D.C.

Notable speakers
Notable speakers at World Affairs Council of the Desert events have included:

Lt. General Michael Hamel, former Commander of the U.S. Space and Missile Systems Center
Dr. Nicholas Lardy, Senior Fellow, Peterson Institute for International Economics
Ambassador Jeffrey Davidow, former U.S. Ambassador to Mexico and Venezuela
Bruce Riedel, Senior Fellow, Saban Center for Middle East Policy at the Brookings Institution
Jacob Dayan, former Consul General of Israel
Dr. Kamal Ali Beyoghlow, Professor of International Relations National Defense University
Christopher Preble, Director of Foreign Policy Studies, Cato Institute in Washington D.C.
Dr. George Friedman, Chief Executive Officer, Stratfor
Dr. Paul R. Pillar, Professor of Security Studies, Georgetown University
Dr. Abraham Lowenthal, Fellow in Latin America and International Affairs, University of Southern California (USC)
Former Massachusetts Governor Michael Dukakis
Ambassador Robert M. Kimmitt, former U.S Deputy Secretary of the Treasury
Kenneth Starr, President of Baylor University and former U.S Solicitor General
Ambassador Nancy Soderberg, American Foreign Policy Strategist
K.T. McFarland, Fox News Analyst
Donald Prell, Futurologist
Gen. John Abizaid, former commander of CENTCOM
Dr. Abbas Milani, Director of Iran Studies, Stanford University
Ambassador Meghan O'Sullivan, Harvard University Kennedy School of Government

References

Non-profit organizations based in California
Organizations based in Riverside County, California
Organizations established in the 1970s